Rabdophaga jaapi is a species of gall midges which forms galls on creeping willow (Salix repens).

Description
The gall is an enlarged bud on S. repens. It is surrounded with small thickened leaves which have short silver-white hairs. Correct identification of the species of Salix is important for the identification of R. jaapi, because it is similar to R. rosariella, which forms galls on sallows.{{efn|In this case sallow refers to S. aurita, S. caprea and [[Salix cinerea|S. cinerea]].}} The gall of R. jaapi can also be positively identified by the single reddish-yellow larva which has a sternal spatula, i.e. ″... a structure on the underside of the thorax of the final (third) instar larva of Cecidomyiidae...''″.

The species has one generation a year (i.e. univoltine) and the larva hibernates in the gall where it pupates.

Distribution
Has been found in Denmark and Great Britain.

Notes

References

jaapi
Nematoceran flies of Europe
Gall-inducing insects
Insects described in 1916
Taxa named by Ewald Heinrich Rübsaamen
Willow galls